Isaac ben Mordecai, known as Maestro Gajo, was an Italian Jewish physician. He acted as physician to Pope Nicholas IV or Pope Boniface VIII, at the end of the thirteenth century. 

For him Nathan of Cento translated into Hebrew an Arabic work by 'Ammar ibn Ali al-Mauṣili, on the cure of diseases of the eye. Gajo was held in great esteem by the physicians Zerahiah ben Shealtiel Ḥen and Hillel ben Samuel of Verona. From Forlì, the latter wrote to Gajo two long letters (see "Ḥemdah Genuzah," pp. 18-22) on the dispute concerning Maimonides's doctrines, which Gajo followed with interest.

References
Grätz, Geschichte 3d ed., vii. 160, 165; 
Vogelstein and Rieger, Geschichte der Juden in Rom, i. 252-254

External links
Source

13th-century Italian Jews
Papal physicians
13th-century Italian physicians
Medieval Jewish physicians